Arthur Henry Gould Kerry (21 July 1879 – 1967) was an English professional footballer who played for Oxford City, Tottenham Hotspur and Oxford University.

Football career 
Kerry began his playing career at Tottenham Hotspur without playing a first team game in his first spell at the club. He went on to join Oxford City before re-joining Tottenham in 1909. The outside left made one appearance for the Lilywhites. Kerry ended his career playing for the Oxford University football side.

References 

1879 births
1967 deaths
Footballers from Oxford
English footballers
Association football outside forwards
Oxford City F.C. players
Tottenham Hotspur F.C. players
Oxford University A.F.C. players
English Football League players